Hashtabad (also Romanized as Hashtābād) is a village in Yateri Rural District, in the Central District of Aradan County, Semnan Province, Iran. At the 2006 census, its population was 696, in 210 families.

References 

Populated places in Aradan County